Flatbush Avenue is a major avenue in the New York City Borough of Brooklyn. It runs from the Manhattan Bridge south-southeastward to Jamaica Bay, where it joins the Marine Parkway–Gil Hodges Memorial Bridge, which connects Brooklyn to the Rockaway Peninsula in Queens. The north end was extended from Fulton Street to the Manhattan Bridge as "Flatbush Avenue Extension".

The avenue is a four-lane street throughout the majority of its run. North of Atlantic Avenue and south of Utica Avenue, it is a six-lane-wide median-divided street.

Effect on street grid

The diagonal path of Flatbush Avenue creates a unique street pattern in every neighborhood it touches. It is the central artery of the borough, carrying traffic to and from Manhattan past landmarks such as MetroTech Center, City Point, the Fulton Mall, Junior's, Long Island University Brooklyn, the Brooklyn Academy of Music, the Long Island Rail Road's Atlantic Terminal, the Barclays Center, Grand Army Plaza, the Brooklyn Public Library, the Brooklyn Botanic Garden, Prospect Park, Erasmus Hall High School, Kings Theatre, Brooklyn College, and Floyd Bennett Field.

Flatbush Avenue is the border of Prospect Heights/Park Slope and many other neighborhoods. Other main Brooklyn thoroughfares start at Flatbush Avenue, including Ocean Avenue and Empire Boulevard (both at Willink Plaza), Linden Boulevard, Eastern Parkway, and Utica Avenue.

History
Prior to European settlement, several Native American trails crossed Brooklyn. These were later widened into "ferry roads" by 17th-century Dutch settlers, since they were used to provide transport to the waterfront. One was the Flatbush Road, running roughly north–south to the east of the path of present-day Flatbush Avenue. The road ran roughly along what is now the eastern edge of Prospect Park and taking advantage of a low point in the Heights of Guan that form the spine of Long Island. A monument beside the former Flatbush Road, now inside the park, commemorates an attempt to block the road at Battle Pass during the Battle of Long Island. For much of the 19th century, it had a plank road run by a turnpike company. Historic homes line the neighborhoods around the avenue, which in the late 1920s was straightened to its current form. Streets such as Amersfort Place that are remnants of old parts of the avenue remain in the city grid as an echo of the past.

Transportation
The majority of Flatbush Avenue is served by the  route of MTA Regional Bus Operations, though the  route also serves Flatbush Avenue south of Nostrand Avenue. Several bus routes also use the avenue for shorter stretches.

The New York City Subway's IRT Nostrand Avenue Line has a southern terminus at the Flatbush Avenue–Brooklyn College station, while the BMT Brighton Line and IRT Eastern Parkway Line run under the avenue between Prospect Park and DeKalb Avenue, and Grand Army Plaza and Nevins Street, respectively.

See also
 Smith & Gray Company Building

References

Streets in Brooklyn